Utricularia myriocista is a medium-sized suspended aquatic carnivorous plant that belongs to the genus Utricularia. U. myriocista is endemic to South America and can be found in Argentina, Bolivia, Brazil, French Guiana, Guyana, Suriname, Trinidad, and Venezuela.

See also 
 List of Utricularia species

References 

Carnivorous plants of South America
Flora of Argentina
Flora of Bolivia
Flora of Brazil
Flora of French Guiana
Flora of Guyana
Flora of Suriname
Flora of Trinidad and Tobago
Flora of Venezuela
myriocista